Frank Campeau (December 14, 1864 – November 5, 1943) was an American actor. He appeared in more than 90 films between 1911 and 1940 and made many appearances in films starring Douglas Fairbanks. 

On Broadway, Campeau appeared in Rio Grande (1916), Believe Me Xantippe (1913), The Ghost Breaker (1913), and The Virginian (1904). Campeau's screen debut came in the one-reel western film Kit Carson's Wooing.

He was born in Detroit, Michigan, and died in the Motion Picture & Television Country House and Hospital in Woodland Hills, Los Angeles.

Filmography

 Jordan Is a Hard Road (1915) - Bill Minden
 The Wood Nymph (1916) - David Arnold
 Intolerance (1916) - Minor Role (uncredited)
 The Heart of Texas Ryan (1917) - 'Dice' McAllister
 The Man from Painted Post (1917) - 'Bull' Madden
 Reaching for the Moon (1917) - Black Boris
 A Modern Musketeer (1917) - Chin-de-dah
 Headin' South (1918) - Spanish Joe
 Mr. Fix-It (1918) - Uncle Henry Burroughs
 Say! Young Fellow (1918) - The Villain
 Bound in Morocco (1918) - Basha El Harib - Governor of Harib
 He Comes Up Smiling (1918) - John Bartlett
 The Light of Western Stars (1918) - Minor Role
 Arizona (1918) - Kellar
 Cheating Cheaters (1919) - Steven Wilson
 The Knickerbocker Buckaroo (1919) - Crooked Sheriff
 His Majesty, the American (1919) - Grand Duke Sarzeau
 When the Clouds Roll by (1919) - Mark Drake
 The Mollycoddle (1920) - Man at Trading Post (uncredited)
 Life of the Party (1920) - Judge Voris
 The Kid (1921) - Welfare Officer (uncredited)
 The Killer (1921) - Henry Hooper
 The Nut (1921) - Ulysses S. Grant Impersonator (uncredited)
 For Those We Love (1921) - Frank
 The Sin of Martha Queed (1921) - David Boyd
 The Lane That Had No Turning (1922) - Tardiff
 The Greater Duty (1922)
 The Crimson Challenge (1922) - Basil Courtrey (uncredited)
 The Trap (1922) - The Police Sergeant
 Just Tony (1922) - Lew Hervey
 The Yosemite Trail (1922) - Jerry Smallbones
 Skin Deep (1922) - Boss McQuarg
 Three Who Paid (1923) - Edward Sanderson
 The Spider and the Rose (1923) - Don Fernando
 Quicksands (1923) - Ring Member
 The Isle of Lost Ships (1923) - Detective Jackson
 Modern Matrimony (1923) - Mr. Flynn
 To the Last Man (1923) - Blue
 The Meanest Man in the World (1923)
 North of Hudson Bay (1923) - Cameron McDonald
 Hoodman Blind (1923) - Mark Lezzard
 Not a Drum Was Heard (1924) - Banker Rand
 Those Who Dance (1924) - 'Slip' Blaney
 The Alaskan (1924) - Stampede Smith
 Battling Bunyan (1924) - Jim Canby
 Coming Through (1925) - Shackleton
 The Saddle Hawk (1925) - Buck Brent
 Heir-Loons (1925) - Brockton family member
 Manhattan Madness (1925) - The Butler
 The Man from Red Gulch (1925) - John Falloner
 The Golden Cocoon (1925) - Mr. Bancroft
 The Pleasure Buyers (1925) - Quintard
 Sea Horses (1926) - Senor Cordoza
 The Frontier Trail (1926) - Shad Donlin
 3 Bad Men (1926) - 'Spade' Allen
 No Man's Gold (1926) - Frank Healy
 Whispering Wires (1926) - Andrew Morphy
 Let It Rain (1927) - Marine Major
 The Heart of the Yukon (1927) - Old Skin Full
 The First Auto (1927) - Mayor Sam Robbins
 In Old Arizona (1928) - Man Chasing Cisco (uncredited)
 The Candy Kid (1928)
 Frozen River (1929) - Potter
 The Gamblers (1929) - Raymond
 Say It with Songs (1929) - Police Officer
 Points West (1929) - McQuade
 In the Headlines (1929) - Detective Robinson
 Sea Fury (1929) - Boatswain
 Hide-Out (1930)
 Abraham Lincoln (1930) - General Sheridan
 The Last of the Duanes (1930) - Luke Stevens
 A Soldier's Plaything (1930) - Joe
 Lightnin' (1930) - Sheriff Brooks (uncredited)
 Captain Thunder (1930) - Hank
 Fighting Caravans (1931) - Jeff Moffitt
 Lasca of the Rio Grande (1931) - Jehosaphat Smith
 Girl of the Rio (1932) - Bill
 Smoky (1933) - 'Scrubby'
 Hop-Along Cassidy (1935) - Henchman Frisco
 Call of the Wild (1935) - Sourdough on Street (uncredited)
 The Robin Hood of El Dorado (1936) - Steve - Coach Driver (uncredited)
 Everyman's Law (1936) - Tinker Gibbs
 The Border Patrolman (1936) - Capt. Stevens
 Empty Saddles (1936) - Kit Kress
 The Firefly (1937) - Beggar (uncredited)
 Black Aces (1937) - Cowhand Ike Bowlaigs
 The Painted Trail (1938) - U. S. Marshal G. Masters
 Border Wolves (1938) - Surviving Wagon Driver
 Marie Antoinette (1938) - Lemonade Vendor (uncredited)
 King of the Sierras (1938) - Jim
 Murder on the Yukon (1940) - Man in the Store (uncredited)

References

External links

1864 births
1943 deaths
Male actors from Detroit
American male film actors
American male silent film actors
20th-century American male actors